In the historically informed performance movement, musicians perform classical music using restored or replicated versions of the instruments for which it was originally written.  Often performances by such musicians are said to be "on authentic instruments".

This article consists of a list of such instruments in the European tradition, including both instruments that are now obsolete and early versions of instruments that continued to be used in later classical music.

Renaissance (1400–1600)

Strings
 Violin
 Viol
 Viola
 Cello
 Lira da braccio
 Contrabass
 Violone
 Lute
 Theorbo
 Archlute
 Gittern
 Mandore
 Harp
 Cittern
 Vihuela

Woodwinds
 Cornamuse
 Cromorne
 Crumhorn
 Rauschpfeife
 Recorder
 Shawm
 Dulcian

Brasses
 Trumpet
 Cornett
 Sackbut
 Serpent
 Natural horn
 Slide trumpet
 Natural trumpet
 Horn

Keyboards
 Clavichord
 Harpsichord
 Regal
 Virginal
 Ottavino
 Organ

Percussion
 Drum
 Timpani
 Cymbals
 Bass drum
 Tabor

Baroque (1600–1750)

Strings
 Violino piccolo
 Violin
 Viol
 Viola da gamba
 Viola
 Viola d'amore
 Viola pomposa
 Tenor violin
 Cello
 Violoncello piccolo
 Contrabass
 Colascione
 Violone
 Lute
 Theorbo
 Archlute
 Angélique
 Mandore
 Mandolin
 Baroque guitar
 Harp
 Hurdy-gurdy

Woodwind
 Baroque flute
 Chalumeau
 Kortholt (also known as Cortholt, Curtall, Oboe family)
 Dulcian
 Baroque oboe
 Rackett
 Recorder
 Oboe d'amore
 Oboe da caccia
 Contrabassoon
 Taille
 Cor anglais

Brasses
 Baroque trumpet
 Cornett
 Serpent
 Natural horn
 Slide trumpet
 Post horn
 Natural trumpet
 Horn
 Trombone

Keyboards
 Clavichord
 Harpsichord
 Spinet
 Organ

Percussion
 Drum
 Timpani
 Cymbals
 Bass drum
 Tabor
 Snare drum

Classical (1750–1820)

Strings
 Violin
 Viola
 Cello
 Double bass
 Guitar
 Mandolin

Woodwinds
 Basset clarinet
 Basset horn
 Clarinette d'amour
 Clarinet
 Chalumeau
 Classical flute
 Oboe
 Bassoon
 Contrabassoon
 Cor anglais

Keyboards
 Clavichord
 Harpsichord
 Spinet
 Fortepiano (early Piano)
 Organ

Brasses
 Buccin
 Ophicleide—a Serpent replacement, precursor of the Tuba
 Natural trumpet
 Natural horn
 Trombone
 Post horn

Percussion
 Drum
 Timpani
 Cymbals
 Bass drum
 Snare drum

See also
 Castrato

External links 
 Early musical instruments
 Historical Brass Instruments as described by Antique Sound Workshop, Ltd.

Historically informed performance
Lists of musical instruments